was a Japanese freestyle wrestler. He won silver medals at the 1952 Olympics, 1954 World Championships and 1954 Asian Games. In retirement he worked as a wrestling coach and in this capacity attended the 1960 Olympics. In 2016, he died of a heart attack, aged 85.

References

1930 births
2016 deaths
Olympic wrestlers of Japan
Wrestlers at the 1952 Summer Olympics
Japanese male sport wrestlers
Olympic silver medalists for Japan
Olympic medalists in wrestling
Asian Games medalists in wrestling
Wrestlers at the 1954 Asian Games
Medalists at the 1952 Summer Olympics
Medalists at the 1954 Asian Games
Asian Games silver medalists for Japan
20th-century Japanese people
21st-century Japanese people